Oland, Öland or Øland may refer to:

 Öland, a Swedish island in the Baltic Sea
 County of Öland, a former county of Sweden containing the island of Öland
 Åland, an autonomic archipelago in the Baltic Sea belonging to Finland
 Oland (Frisian island), a German island belonging to the North Frisian group
 Oland Brewery, a brewery in Halifax, Nova Scotia, Canada
 Oland Hundred, a district of Uppland, Sweden

As a surname
Anne Øland (1949–2015), a Danish pianist, 
 Philip Oland (1910–1996), a Canadian businessman
 Richard Oland (1941–2011), a Canadian businessman
 Victor de Bedia Oland (1913–1983), a Canadian politician
 Warner Oland (1879–1938), a Swedish actor